Andrija Vukčević (Cyrillic: Андрија Вукчевић, born 11 October 1996) is a Montenegrin professional footballer who plays as a left back for the HNL club Rijeka.

Club career

Budućnost
Vukčević represented Budućnost Podgorica as a youth, and was promoted to the first team in June 2013. On 11 August he made his senior debut at the age of 17, starting in a 1–1 home draw against Mladost Podgorica.

Vukčević scored his first goal as a senior on 19 October 2013, netting the first in a 1–2 away loss against Čelik Nikšić. He finished the campaign as an undisputed starter, contributing with two goals in 30 appearances as his side achieved a UEFA Europa League spot.

Vukčević made his European debut on 3 July 2014, playing the full 90 minutes in a 2–1 win at Sanmarinese club Folgore Falciano.

Sevilla
On 14 January 2016 Vukčević moved to Sevilla, signing a three-and-a-half-year deal and being immediately assigned to the reserves in Segunda División B. He appeared in four matches during the season, as the B-side achieved promotion to Segunda División.

On 23 January 2017, after failing to feature in any appearances for the first half of the campaign, Vukčević was loaned to third division side San Fernando until June.

Spartak Subotica
In the summer of 2017, he joined Serbian club Spartak Subotica.

Waasland-Beveren
On 26 July 2019, Vukčević signed a four-year contract with Belgian club Waasland-Beveren in a €250,000 transfer from Spartak Subotica. There he became teammates with fellow countryman Stefan Milošević.

International career
Vukčević represented Montenegro at under-17, under-19 and under-21 levels.

References

External links

1996 births
Living people
Footballers from Podgorica
Association football fullbacks
Montenegrin footballers
Montenegro youth international footballers
Montenegro under-21 international footballers
Montenegro international footballers
FK Budućnost Podgorica players
Sevilla Atlético players
San Fernando CD players
FK Spartak Subotica players
S.K. Beveren players
HNK Rijeka players
Montenegrin First League players
Segunda División B players
Serbian SuperLiga players
Belgian Pro League players
Croatian Football League players
Montenegrin expatriate footballers
Expatriate footballers in Spain
Montenegrin expatriate sportspeople in Spain
Expatriate footballers in Serbia
Montenegrin expatriate sportspeople in Serbia
Expatriate footballers in Belgium
Montenegrin expatriate sportspeople in Belgium
Expatriate footballers in Croatia
Montenegrin expatriate sportspeople in Croatia